Garfield is an unincorporated community in Portage County, Wisconsin, United States.

Geography

It rests on the present-day location in the Town of New Hope on the intersection of Portage County Roads A south and Z to the east.

Poncho Creek and the Tomorrow River southwest of Garfield are becoming a part of the Richard A. Hemp Fishery Area.

References

External links
 here  to visit the Portage County Historical Society.

Unincorporated communities in Wisconsin
Unincorporated communities in Portage County, Wisconsin

vo:Custer (Wisconsin)